Maria Irene Susanto (born 22 March 1980), commonly known as Rinrin Marinka, is an Indonesian chef and restaurateur who was a judge of MasterChef Indonesia and Junior MasterChef Indonesia.

Education 
 Elementary & Junior High - Gandhi International School, Jakarta
 Pelita Harapan High School, Karawaci, Tangerang
 Completed Art & Design KVB Institute College Certificate IV Sydney, Australia (1998-1999)
 Attending Visual Communication, Majoring Fashion Design  KVB Institute College Sydney, Australia (1999-2002)
 Completed Grand Diploma of French Cuisine & Pattiseire Le Cordon Bleu Sydney, Australia (September 2002-April 2004)

TV Shows 
 Kuis Rejeki Ramadhan Sasa (Trans 7)
 Selebrita Siang (Trans 7)
 Selamat Pagi (Trans 7)
 Cooking in Paradise (Trans 7)
 Sendok Garpu (Jak TV)
 Sisi kota (TVN)
 Dunia Laki-laki (TVN)
 MasterChef Indonesia (RCTI)
 MasterClass (RCTI)
 JKT48 School Global TV
 Junior MasterChef Indonesia (RCTI)
 Wonderful Indonesia Flavours (Asian Food Channel)
 At Home With Marinka (Asian Food Channel)

Commercial 
 La Rasa
 Tepung Bumbu Sasa

References

External links 
  Marinka on My Super Lounge
 

Living people
Indonesian chefs
Indonesian people of Chinese descent
1980 births
Australian chefs